Nur Artıran is a researcher, writer, scholar and educator on the path of Rumi. Her Sufi Master was Şefik Can of whom she is the successor. She is the President of the Şefik Can International Mevlânâ Education and Culture Foundation.

References

Living people
Turkish Sufis
Mevlevi Order
Year of birth missing (living people)